Kaashi in Search of Ganga is a 2018 Bollywood suspense thriller film directed by Dhiraj Kumar starring Sharman Joshi and Aishwarya Devan in lead roles. The film is a Bollywood debut for Aishwarya Devan. In supporting roles the film also stars Govind Namdev, Akhilendra Mishra, Paritosh Tripathi, Manoj Joshi and Manoj Pahwa. The film is directed by Dhiraj Kumar and written by Manish Kishore. The film has been produced by Insite India. The film is set in the Indian city of Benaras, also known as Kashi. Kaashi is a man who belongs to a community who are involved in performing cremation rituals.

Plot 
The movie is about two siblings, Kaashi (Sharman Joshi) and his sister Ganga (Priyanka Singh). When Ganga goes missing, Kaashi starts the search to find her, but the main challenge begins when people refuse to even believe that Ganga exists. Devina (Aishwarya Devan) plays a journalist who helps in the search for Ganga.

Kaashi lives happily with his parents and sister Ganga. One evening his sister does not return home from college. He starts looking for Ganga along with Devina. He files a police report later that night and keeps his own search going. Next day, the college principal checks the records and informs that Ganga does not study there. She questions the character of Ganga which enrages Kaashi. He beats up some local goons who claims to have information on his sister but refuse to divulge it.

Devina finds one of Ganga's college friend who is ready to talk though seems frightened. She informs that Ganga was having affair with Abhimanyu (son of Balwant Pandey, a local strongman). She has not seen Ganga since Ganga got pregnant. Enraged Kaashi threatens Balwant to return his sister safely. Balwant informs him that Abhimanyu is in Mussorie. Devina and Kaashi travel to Mussorie where Kaashi finds Abhimanyu with another woman in a hotel room. Abhimanyu pleads that he does not know any Ganga and is killed by Kaashi who is then arrested.

A disfigured dead body of a girl is found which is identified as Ganga based on the clothes she was wearing. The case moves to court. The lawyers fight things out. Some witness say they haven't seen Ganga or her parents. Some say they exist. Kaashi's parents are also not found at home. Amidst the confusion, a psychiatrist talks to Kaashi and informs the court that Kaashi is suffering from schizophrenia. An argument breaks out between him and Balwant in court. Kaashi grabs a gun and shoots Balwant dead (convinced that Balwant was the one who killed Ganga as Abhimanyu was in Mussorie (Uttrakhand) for some time.

Kaashi is put in a psychiatric facility where he starts questioning his own sanity. Then the real story comes out. Devina is the one who is behind all this. Remorseful Devina confides to the girl who was earlier identified as Ganga's friend. Devina says she wanted revenge but not at Kashi's cost. She goes and meet Kaashi and explain the whole story.

She tells Kaashi that he is suffering from schizophrenia and his parents and sister were dead long ago. He just imagines them and she identified his condition the first time she met him. Balwant was her father's business partner and killed her family 15 years back. She used Kaashi and fabricated the story of Ganga gone missing, Ganga's college friend was in fact Devina's own sister. Kaashi now full of anger and sadness admits that he loves Devina and wanted to spend his life with her. He then kills Devina and is shown lying next to her dead body.

In the last scene he is shown in the psychiatric facility living with Devina (who he is imagining).

Cast 

 Sharman Joshi as Kaashi Chaudhary
 Priyanka Singh as Ganga Chaudhary 
 Aishwarya Devan as Devina Khanna 
 Govind Namdev as Balwant Pandey
 Paritosh Tripathi as Rangeela
 Kranti Prakash Jha as Babina
 Manoj Joshi as Kaashi's Lawyer
 Akhilendra Mishra as Balwant's Lawyer
 Manoj Pahwa as a judge
 Gauri Shankar as Inspector Ghanshyam Yadav 
 Joginder Tiwari as Chunnu
 Mugdha Meharia as Shruti
 Shahnawaz Khan as Murari
 Mehul Surana as Abhimanyu Pandey
 Pusshkar Tiwari as Munna
 Pankaj Kesari
 Riyana Sukla

Shooting locations 
Some known locations for shoots of the film are in Varanasi where shooting took place for over a month such as Assi Ghat and the bylanes of Varanasi.

Soundtrack

The album is composed by Ankit Tiwari, Vipin Patwa, Raaj Aashoo and DJ Emenes while the lyrics penned by Shabbir Ahmed and Abhendra Kumar Upadhyay.

Release 
The film was released in India on 26 October 2018. The motion poster for the movie was released on 18 September 2018. The trailer for the movie was released on 19 September 2018.

Reception 
On the basis of 54 user ratings, the movie got 3.5/5 stars on Bollywood Hungama. Renuka Vyavahare of The Times of India gave the movie 1.5/5 stars saying that the film is a "mockery of 'suspense'" and that the "film ends up as an unintentional comedy"; but she adds, "Sharman Joshi and Manoj Joshi are perhaps the only actors that try to infuse some meaning to this inane story." Kunal Guha of Mumbai Mirror gave the movie 1.5/5 stars, writing that the "film lacks logic in its writing", but added that Aishwarya Devan is "fairly convincing for the large part". The average readers rating in Mumani Mirror for the movie was 3/5.

Indo-Asian News Service gave the movie 3/5 stars, saying that the movie "is a layered tale of revenge with a good dose of romance and suspense." Saumya Gourisaria of 'The Live Mirror' gave the movie 0.5/5 stars saying that the movie "is so outrageous that it will make you laugh".

Box office 
The film grossed ₹ 2 million on its opening day and by the end of the opening weekend total collections were around ₹ 7 million.

Controversies 
During the shoot of the film, a fight broke out leaving a crew member hospitalised and a FIR was filed.

References

External links
 
 

2010s Hindi-language films
Indian thriller films
2018 thriller films
Hindi-language thriller films
Films scored by Vipin Patwa
Films scored by Ankit Tiwari